David Ribi (born 1 August 1987) is an English actor best known for presenting the hit Kids TV show 'Milkshake!' on Channel 5. He is also known for his roles in West End Theatre and touring productions. He trained in musical theatre at the YEM Theatre School until 2006, and studied Drama and Theatre at Royal Holloway until 2009.

As well as being a British TV personality, Ribi is also a singer-songwriter, music producer, and session singer, and has performs with his vocal groups 'Triptonic' and 'Three Kings' all over the world.

Career

Theatre
Ribi has a number of theatre credits. Whilst training, he appeared in several leading roles, including 'Tommy' in The Who's Tommy, and 'Tobias Ragg' in Sweeny Todd: The Demon Barber of Fleet Street, among others (see below).

In 2011, it was announced that Ribi would play the lead role of 'Bobby' in the 2011-2012 Dreamboats and Petticoats UK Tour, produced by Bill Kenwright. Upon the completion of the tour, Ribi took up the same lead role of Bobby in the West End version of the show at the Playhouse Theatre, and then the Wyndhams Theatre, which ran until 4 August 2012.

From 13 December 2012 until 6 January 2013, Ribi starred as Aladdin in the pantomime of the same name at the Octagon Theatre, Yeovil.

In 2013, Ribi joined the cast of the UK tour of Hairspray as 'Sketch' and second cover Link Larkin. The tour ran from 11 February 2013 until 29 September 2013.

Ribi returned to panto during the 2013/2014 Christmas season, playing the lead role of Peter Pan in the pantomime of the same name, at Fairfield Hall, Croydon, alongside Steve McFadden (Captain Hook). The show ran from 6 December 2013 until 5 January 2014.

In May 2014, it was announced that Ribi would be taking on the lead role of 'Zanna' in 'Zanna, Don't!' from 3–29 June at the Landor Theatre, London. The story in which Ribi serves as the lead (Zanna) is set in a parallel universe where homosexuality is the norm and heterosexuality is a taboo. Set in mid-west America, "Zanna" takes place at heterophobic Heartsville High. Zanna is the school's matchmaker, bringing together happy couples until the football team's quarterback and the captain of the Girls' Intramural Mechanical Bull-Riding Team begin to discover their feelings for each other.

Following his success in Zanna, Don't!, Ribi announced that he would play "Man 1" in I Love You, You're Perfect! Now Change! at the Battersea Barge from 14 to 17 July 2014.

In 2015, Ribi joined the European Tour of 'The Rocky Horror Show' as Leading man "Brad Majors". The production toured all of Germany, Austria, Luxembourg and much of Italy and Switzerland.  Produced by BB Promotion this version of the show is renowned across Europe as a cult hit.

In February 2016, Ribi joined the cast of Mamma Mia on its first ever UK Tour, as first cover Sky. The tour ran for a year, until February 2017.

Music
Ribi is a keen singer/songwriter and has written his own music, which can be found on his YouTube channel. His debut album is due to be released later this year.

On 10 December 2012, a single "Onesie Time" was released on iTunes, co-written by Ribi, and featuring his vocals, along with those of other notable names such as West End performers Samantha Dorrance (Dreamboats and Petticoats), Sabrina Aloueche (We Will Rock You), Tim Driesen (Rock of Ages) and Christopher Biggins, collectively dubbed 'The West End Onesie Club' - all performers wore onesies throughout the recording process.

Television

Ribi has become a morning TV staple across the UK as a presenter of the hit Channel 5 Children's TV programme 'Milkshake!', where he has worked since May 2017 to present.
The show broadcasts every morning from 6am, 365 days a year. 

Ribi has made appearances on several UK television shows. His first was in March 2012, with the cast of Dreamboats and Petticoats on the BBC TV Series The Late Show. They performed "Let's Go To The Hop", a musical number from the show.
In February 2013, Ribi appeared on the ITV daytime show This Morning with the cast of the UK tour of Hairspray. They performed "You Can't Stop The Beat", the finale song from Act 2 of the show.

Only One Direction
In early 2012, Only One Direction formed as a tribute band to the teen sensations One Direction, the first of its kind in the world. The tribute band was an instant hit, attracting nationwide attention which led to the band performing up to seven shows a week. The band performed to over 150000 audience members in its first two years, quickly establishing its presence in the music industry. The band initially consisted of five members, Henry Allan (portraying One Direction member Harry Styles), Jamie SEARLS (Zayn Malik), Andy Fowler (Louis Tomlinson), Aaron Foster (Liam Payne), and Matt Brinkler (Niall Horan), but due to high demand for performances, the band expanded in 2013, bringing alternates to perform at some of the shows. David Ribi, described on the band's website (along with the other alternates) as "the best of the best in performing talent", joined the band as an alternate Niall Horan. He has toured internationally with the band, showcasing his musical ability. Throughout 2014, demand for Ribi and the band continues to be high, allowing for their first UK theatre tour, United Arab Emirates tour, and the continuation of their European residencies.

Music and theatre credits

References

1987 births
Living people
English male musical theatre actors
English male singer-songwriters